Nippoptilia vitis (grape plume moth) is a moth of the family Pterophoridae, that is known from Japan (Honshu, Shikoku, Kyushu, Tsushima), Korea, Taiwan, China and Thailand.

The larvae feed on Ampelopsis glandulosa, Cayratia japonica, Parthenocissus tricuspidata, Vitis thunbergii and Vitis vinifera. They feed on the flowers leaves of their host plants. When feeding on the leaf of Cayratia japonica, it eats a leaf from the under surface. The pupal period lasts for about a week.

References

External links
Taxonomic And Biological Studies Of Pterophoridae Of Japan (Lepidoptera)
Japanese Moths

Platyptiliini
Moths described in 1913
Moths of Asia